A1000 may refer to:

 Amiga 1000, a personal computer manufactured by Commodore International
 A1000 road, a main road in the United Kingdom
 Motorola A1000, a Motorola 3G Smartphone
 Sony NW-A1000, a Walkman digital audio player